The Boulder Solar project is a 150 megawatt (MWAC) photovoltaic power station near Boulder City, Nevada. It was built in two phases by SunPower using its Oasis Power Plant system. The project is co-located with several other large solar power projects in the Eldorado Valley.

Facility details
The 100 MW Boulder Solar 1 began construction on 600 acres in December 2015, and went online in mid-December 2016. It uses 288,000 tracker-mounted panels manufactured by SunPower.  It has an expected annual production of about 280 GWh and will provide Boulder City with $20 million in land lease payments over the 20-year term.

Southern Power purchased a controlling (51%) interest in Boulder Solar 1 in November 2016.  New Energy Solar purchased the remaining 49% interest in February 2018. The electricity is being sold to NV Energy under a 20-year power purchase agreement.  Along with geothermal power and numerous smaller solar energy installations  throughout the city, Boulder Solar 1 allowed Las Vegas to operate all municipal services with renewable energy sources starting at the end of 2016.

The 50 MW Boulder Solar 2, also constructed by SunPower, entered service in January 2017 with an expected annual production of 140 GWh.  It is owned by American Electric Power and is also selling its electricity to NV Energy.  Apple Inc. motivated this construction phase of the project through the participation of its northern Nevada data centers in the NV GreenEnergy Rider opportunity.

Electricity production

See also 

 Nevada Solar One
 Copper Mountain Solar Facility
 Techren Solar Project
 Solar power in Nevada
 List of power stations in Nevada

References

External links 
 NV Energy Renewable Energy 2015

Solar power in the Mojave Desert
Photovoltaic power stations in the United States
Buildings and structures in Clark County, Nevada
Energy infrastructure completed in 2016
Solar power stations in Nevada
2016 establishments in Nevada